Black comedy is a style of comedy that makes light of subject matter that is generally considered taboo.

Black comedy or Black Comedy may also refer to:

Black Comedy (play), by Peter Shaffer, 1965
Black Comedy (TV series), an Australian sketch comedy series
Black Comedy (film), a 2014 Hong Kong film
Comedy (Black album), 1988

See also

Black sitcom, a sitcom in American culture that mainly features an African American cast
 Blaxploitation, an ethnic subgenre of the exploitation film
Kenny Larkin, who also releases as Dark Comedy, an American techno producer
 Shakespearean problem play, whose tone shifts violently between comic and dark, psychological drama